There are two Bhagavatas in Hindu puranic Literature 

 Bhagavata Purana - krishna related text.
 Devi-Bhagavata Purana - Goddess related text.